Jen Hong is a Taiwanese politician. He was the Deputy Minister of the Overseas Chinese Affairs Council of the Executive Yuan.

References

Political office-holders in the Republic of China on Taiwan

Living people
Year of birth missing (living people)